Kevin Michael Salvadori (born December 30, 1970) is an American former professional basketball player.  A center from the University of North Carolina, Salvadori went undrafted but did manage to play for the Sacramento Kings of the National Basketball Association for two seasons from 1996 to 1998. He was listed at 7'0". He is currently an assistant basketball coach at Belmont Abbey College, a Division II program near Charlotte, North Carolina.

His father, Al Salvadori, was drafted by the Baltimore Bullets in the 4th round (1st pick) of the 1967 NBA draft and was also selected by the Oakland Oaks of the American Basketball Association.  Al Salvadori played one season for Oakland.

In his NBA career, Kevin Salvadori played in 39 games and scored a total of 42 points. He graduated from Seton-La Salle Catholic High School in Pittsburgh and was a member of North Carolina's 1993 National Championship team.

References

External links
Basketball-Reference stats

1970 births
Living people
American expatriate basketball people in Belgium
American men's basketball players
Basketball players from West Virginia
Centers (basketball)
Florida Beachdogs players
North Carolina Tar Heels men's basketball players
Rockford Lightning players
Sacramento Kings players
Spirou Charleroi players
Sportspeople from Wheeling, West Virginia
Undrafted National Basketball Association players